The 2001 season was the 89th year of competitive soccer in the United States.

National team

Record

Results
The home team or the team that is designated as the home team is listed in the left column; the away team is in the right column.

Goalscorers

Major League Soccer

Standings

Top eight teams with the highest points clinch play-off berth, regardless of conference.s =

Supporters Shieldx = Clinched playoff berth

Miami Fusion F.C. wins first tiebreaker with Chicago Fire (2-0 in head-to-head competition)
Columbus Crew wins first tiebreaker with San Jose Earthquakes (1-0-1 in head-to-head competition)
GP* (Games Played) = Season shorten due to 9/11 attacks.

Playoffs
Playoff bracket

Points systemWin = 3 Pts.Loss = 0 Pts.Draw = 1 Pt.
ASDET*=Added Sudden Death Extra Time (Game tie breaker)SDET**=Sudden Death Extra Time

(Series tie breaker)Teams will advance at 5 points.

MLS Cup

Lamar Hunt U.S. Open Cup

Bracket
Home teams listed on top of bracket

Final

American clubs in international competitions

D.C. United

Los Angeles Galaxy

Columbus Crew

References
 American competitions at RSSSF
 American national team matches at RSSSF
 CONCACAF Champions' Cup at RSSSF

 
2001